Escatrón is a municipality located in the Ribera Baja del Ebro comarca, province of Zaragoza, Aragon, Spain. According to the 2009 census (INE), the municipality has a population of 1,163 inhabitants.

See also
Ribera Baja del Ebro

References

External links 

Escatrón Town Hall - Official Site

Municipalities in the Province of Zaragoza